The Connemara Railway is a heritage railway at Maam Cross railway station, County Galway in Ireland.  It currently exists as an operable narrow gauge pop-up railway, with standard Irish Gauge track available for static exhibits.

Background
The Clifden branch line from Galway was opened in 1895, and marketed as a tourist line, closing after 1934.   a project is well underway to open a  stretch of line around Maam Cross station.

Project
The ultimate aim of the project is to get steam trains running on an  stretch around Maam Cross, where an all-weather Heritage Centre is to be set up.  Access to the site was gained in 14 February 2017, and the cost of the first phase of the project is expected to be  €300,000.  No MGWR engine was preserved so the hope is to build a new one.

Delays
The hope had been to get a "pop-up" narrow gauge demonstration train running by September 2020, with a special steam traction event, 125 years after the railway first opened and 85 years since it closed in 1935. In the event the COVID-19 pandemic intervened.

The next stage was planned to be removal of the narrow gauge , with standard Irish gauge  laid instead.  The first section of standard gauge was laid in February 2020.

Maam Cross railway station
Maam Cross is located at the crossing of the N59 and R336 roads.  This station, together with that at Ballynahinch were considered insufficiently completed when the line fully opened on 1 July 1895 and were only opened to the public later. The railway station buildings were completed  1896, limestone being found under the peat when digging the foundations. The buildings remaining were a water tower, gatekeepers hut, goods shed and platforms.

The station is sometimes claimed to be a filming location for the 1952 film, The Quiet Man. The nearby White O'Morn Cottage at Maam was, however, used as a film location.

See also
 List of heritage railways in the Republic of Ireland

References

Footnotes

Sources
 
 
 
 
 
 
 
 
 

Heritage railways in the Republic of Ireland
3 ft gauge railways in Ireland